Nor may refer to:

Nor, a word used with "neither" in a correlative conjunction (e.g. "Neither the basketball team nor the football team is doing well.")
Nor, a word used as a coordinating conjunction (e.g. "They do not gamble, nor do they smoke.")

Places
 Nør, Danish name of Noer, Schleswig-Holstein, Germany
 Norma (constellation), by standard astronomical abbreviation Nor
 Norway, a country (ISO 3166-1 alpha-3 code: NOR)

Logic and electronics
 Logical NOR ("Not OR"), a binary operation in logic
 NOR gate, an electronic gate that implements a logical NOR
 NOR logic
 NOR flash, a type of non-volatile computer memory

Science
 nor-, a chemical prefix for "stripped-down" molecules lacking groups (such as methyl-groups); for example, noradrenaline
 Nitrite oxidoreductase, an enzyme
 Nucleolus organizer region, a chromosomal region around which the nucleolus forms in cell biology

Transportation
 Norfolk Orbital Railway, a proposed rail link in the English county of Norfolk
 Normanton railway station, England (National Rail station code: NOR)
 Norðfjörður Airport, by airport identifier code NOR

Other uses
 Norwegian language, by ISO 639-2 language code
 Nor (Wicked), a character in the novel Wicked
 Nór, the eponymous founder-king of Norway in Norse mythology
 Notice of Readiness (to load), or laytime, a notice from a shipowner to a charterer that  the ship has arrived at the port and is ready in all respects to load or discharge

People with the surname
 Polly Nor (born 1989), English artist

See also